TJL Motorsports was a NASCAR Camping World Truck Series team. They fielded the No. 1 Chevrolet Silverado for various drivers in the Camping World Truck Series.

Founding
TJL Motorsports' owner is Tracy Lowe, former co-owner of MAKE Motorsports. For the 2017 NASCAR Camping World Truck Series Lowe and Mark Beaver part ways. Beaver renamed the team to Beaver Motorsports and retained control of the No. 50 entry while Lowe took the assets of the former No. 1 team to create TJL Motorsports.

Truck No. 1 history
At the season opening race at Daytona, the team entered with Tim Viens and crew chief Rodney Jobman with sponsorship from Peterson Excavating and Coons Communications. The team failed to qualify. They entered Atlanta with Mike Harmon and crew chief Darwin Peters Jr. Harmon made the race due to owner points and finished in 27th place, 6 laps down. The team came to Martinsville with driver Bryce Napier and driver Mike Harmon serving as the crew chief with sponsorship from ASAP Appliance Services. The team made the race due to owner points for the second straight week. Napier finished in 32nd, completing 3 laps, as the team retired due to an oil leak. At Kansas, Harmon returned as crew chief, but had Jordan Anderson behind the wheel with sponsorship from Fueled by Fans-SponsorJordan.com, a website to help Anderson gain funding for a truck to field. Anderson qualified 24th and finished 19th, 4 laps down. Anderson, Harmon, and sponsorship returned for Charlotte. Anderson qualified 25th and finished 21st, only 1 lap down. At Dover, Harmon, Anderson, and their sponsorship returned. Anderson qualified 26th but had to go to the rear due to unapproved adjustments. The team completed 82 laps before blowing an engine and finishing in 24th. At Texas, Anderson returned, but Mike Harmon was unable to serve as crew chief due to his Xfinity Series priorities. The team had Ryan Fields be the crew chief with sponsorship from Jordan's website. Jordan qualified 19th in a 28 truck field and finished 15th, 4 laps down.

At Martinsville in 2018, the team gained notoriety when driver Mike Senica disobeyed a NASCAR order to park and proceeded to get a black flag, which he disobeyed and then spun on the backstretch trying to find the garage entrance. Senica, Lowe and crew chief William Guinade wound up getting an invitation to NASCAR's competition hauler after the incident, though no further punishments were handed out. The team only ran one more race after Martinsville, failing to qualify at Kansas with Camden Murphy, withdrawing from the Charlotte race and was absent from the NASCAR scene for the rest of 2018. As of 2022 the team has not made another NASCAR start.

Camping World Truck Series

External links
  Official Twitter Page
  Tracy Lowe Owner Statistics

References

Defunct NASCAR teams
2017 establishments in the United States